André Van Herpe (born 26 October 1933) is a Belgian footballer. He played in seven matches for the Belgium national football team from 1956 to 1958. He was also named in Belgium's squad for the qualification tournament for the 1958 FIFA World Cup.

References

External links
 

1933 births
Living people
Belgian footballers
Belgium international footballers
Place of birth missing (living people)
Association footballers not categorized by position